Ngatea is a small town  on the Hauraki Plains in the North Island of New Zealand. It is located 18 kilometres southwest of Thames and 70 kilometres southeast of Auckland. Ngatea lies on the Piako River, eight kilometres south of its outflow into the Firth of Thames.

Ngatea is the 'service centre' for the farming area of the Hauraki Plains.  It was established in the 1900s as a result of a unique series of canals and stop banks which drained the land and produced rich farmlands for dairy production.

The town also acts as a service town for motorists travelling from Auckland to the Coromandel Peninsula and Bay of Plenty via State Highway 2.

Demographics

Ngatea had a population of 1,452 at the 2018 New Zealand census, an increase of 183 people (14.4%) since the 2013 census, and an increase of 270 people (22.8%) since the 2006 census. There were 576 households, comprising 699 males and 750 females, giving a sex ratio of 0.93 males per female. The median age was 46.1 years (compared with 37.4 years nationally), with 282 people (19.4%) aged under 15 years, 228 (15.7%) aged 15 to 29, 564 (38.8%) aged 30 to 64, and 381 (26.2%) aged 65 or older.

Ethnicities were 89.5% European/Pākehā, 16.1% Māori, 1.4% Pacific peoples, 3.1% Asian, and 1.2% other ethnicities. People may identify with more than one ethnicity.

The percentage of people born overseas was 13.4, compared with 27.1% nationally.

Although some people chose not to answer the census's question about religious affiliation, 54.8% had no religion, 32.2% were Christian, 1.2% had Māori religious beliefs, 0.4% were Hindu, 0.4% were Muslim, 0.4% were Buddhist and 1.9% had other religions.

Of those at least 15 years old, 138 (11.8%) people had a bachelor's or higher degree, and 312 (26.7%) people had no formal qualifications. The median income was $28,800, compared with $31,800 nationally. 168 people (14.4%) earned over $70,000 compared to 17.2% nationally. The employment status of those at least 15 was that 534 (45.6%) people were employed full-time, 138 (11.8%) were part-time, and 27 (2.3%) were unemployed.

Education
Ngatea has two schools:

In 1923 its name was changed to Ngatea District High School. The Government attempted to close the school amid declining attendance, however this was unsuccessful due to unprecedented community support. In 1963, the name was once again changed to Hauraki Plains College.

References

Populated places in Waikato
Hauraki District